Chumik Glacier is located in the Siachen region. Located on the west of Saltoro ridge, it is a 4-mile-long offshoot of the Bilafond Glacier.

History

In military terminology, Chumik is a minor sub sector of Bilafond Sub Sector, near Gyong La. 

In March 1989, Indian Army launched the Operation Ibex to seize the Pakistani post overlooking the Chumik Glacier. The operation was unsuccessful at dislodging Pakistani troops from their positions. The Indian Army under Brig. R. K. Nanavatty then launched an artillery attack on Kauser Base, the Pakistani logistical node on Chumik Glacier. The destruction of Kauser Base induced Pakistani troops to vacate their Chumik posts just west of Gyong La, and Operation Ibex concluded.

See also

 Near the AGPL (Actual Ground Position Line)
 NJ9842, LoC ends and AGPL begins
 Gyong La
 Saltoro Mountains
 Saltoro Kangri
 Ghent Kangri
 Bilafond La
 Sia La
 Indira Col, AGPL ends at LAC
 Chumik Kangri

 Borders
 Actual Ground Position Line (AGPL)
 India–Pakistan International Border {IB)
 Line of Control {LoC)
 Line of Actual Control (LAC)
 Sir Creek (SC)
 Borders of China
 Borders of India
 Borders of Pakistan

 Conflicts
 Kashmir conflict
 Siachen conflict
 Sino-Indian conflict
 List of disputed territories of China
 List of disputed territories of India
 List of disputed territories of Pakistan
 Gilgit Baltistan
 Trans-Karakoram Tract

 Operations
 Operation Meghdoot, by India
 Operation Rajiv, by India
 Operation Safed Sagar, by India

 Other related topics
 Awards and decorations of the Indian Armed Forces
 Bana Singh, after whom Quaid Post was renamed to Bana Top 
 Dafdar, westernmost town in Trans-Karakoram Tract
 India-China Border Roads
 Sino-Pakistan Agreement for transfer of Trans-Karakoram Tract to China

References 

Glaciers of the Karakoram
Glaciers of Ladakh
Glaciers of Gilgit-Baltistan